Jeremiah Mahoney (1840 – November 11, 1902) was a Sergeant in the United States Army and a Medal of Honor recipient for capturing the flag of the 17th Mississippi Infantry at the Battle of Fort Sanders along with two other men.

Mahoney is buried in Holy Cross Cemetery and Mausoleum Malden, Massachusetts.

Medal of Honor citation
Rank and organization: Sergeant, Company A, 29th Massachusetts Infantry. Place and date: At Fort Sanders, Knoxville, Tenn., November 29, 1863. Entered service at. Fall River, Mass. Birth: ------. Date of issue: December 1, 1864.

Citation:

Capture of flag of 17th Mississippi Infantry (C.S.A.).

See also

 List of Medal of Honor recipients
 List of American Civil War Medal of Honor recipients: M–P

Notes

References

  

1840 births
1902 deaths
United States Army Medal of Honor recipients
Union Army soldiers
American Civil War recipients of the Medal of Honor